Brian Richard Dorsett (born April 9, 1961) is an American former professional baseball player who played eight seasons for the Cleveland Indians, California Angels, New York Yankees, San Diego Padres, Cincinnati Reds, and Chicago Cubs of Major League Baseball (MLB).

Playing career
Dorsett attended Indiana State University, and in 1981 he played collegiate summer baseball with the Orleans Cardinals of the Cape Cod Baseball League. He was selected by the Oakland Athletics in the 10th round of the 1983 MLB Draft.

Managerial career
Dorsett back involved in baseball in 2010 when he became the manager of the Terre Haute Rex, a collegiate summer baseball league in the Prospect League for three years up through 2012.

In 2012, Dorsett was selected as the Prospect League Manager of the Year.

Personal
Brian currently owns and operates two car dealership in Terre Haute, IN (Dorsett Mitsubishi/Hyundai and Dorsett Nissan).
He became a co-promoter of the Terre Haute Action Track in 2008 through 2010.

References

External links

1961 births
Living people
American expatriate baseball players in Canada
Baseball players from Indiana
Buffalo Bisons (minor league) players
California Angels players
Chicago Cubs players
Cincinnati Reds players
Cleveland Indians players
Columbus Clippers players
Edmonton Trappers players
Huntsville Stars players
Indiana State Sycamores baseball players
Indianapolis Indians players
Iowa Cubs players
Las Vegas Stars (baseball) players
Madison Muskies players
Major League Baseball catchers
Medford A's players
Modesto A's players
New York Yankees players
Orleans Firebirds players
San Diego Padres players
Sportspeople from Terre Haute, Indiana
Tacoma Tigers players